Scheffler's dwarf gecko (Lygodactylus scheffleri) is a species of lizard in the family Gekkonidae. The species is native to East Africa. There are three recognized subspecies.

Etymology
The specific name, scheffleri, is in honor of Georg Scheffler, who was a German collector of natural history specimens, and who collected the holotype.

Geographic range
L. scheffleri is found in Kenya and Tanzania.

Habitat
The preferred natural habitats of L. scheffleri are forest and savanna.

Reproduction
L. scheffleri is oviparous.

Subspecies
The following three subspecies, including the nominotypical subspecies, are recognized as being valid.
Lygodactylus scheffleri compositus 
Lygodactylus scheffleri scheffleri 
Lygodactylus scheffleri ulugurensis

References

Further reading
Pasteur G (1964). "Recherches sur l'évolution des lygodactyles, lézards Afro-Malagaches actuels ". Travaux de l'Institut scientifique Chérifien, série Zoologie (29): 1–132. (Lygodactylus scheffleri compositus, new subspecies; L. s. ulugurensis, new subspecies). (in French).
Spawls, Howell K, Hinkel H, Menegon M (2018). Field Guide to East African Reptiles, Second Edition. London: Bloomsbury Natural History. 624 pp. . (Lygodactylus scheffleri, p. 113).
Sternfeld R (1912). "Reptilia ". pp. 197–279. In: Schubotz H (1912). Wissenschaftliche Ergebnisse der Deutschen Zentral-Afrika-Expedition, 1907–1908 unter Führung Adolph Friedrichs, Herzogs zu Mecklenburg. Band IV [Volume 4]. Zoologie II. Leipzig: Klinkhardt & Biermann. 485 pp. (Lygodactylus fischeri Var. scheffleri, new variety, pp. 206–207). (in German).

Lygodactylus
Reptiles of Kenya
Reptiles of Tanzania
Reptiles described in 1912
Taxa named by Richard Sternfeld